In these lists of mountains in Ireland, those within Northern Ireland, or on the Republic of Ireland – United Kingdom border, are marked with an asterisk, while the rest are within the Republic of Ireland. Where mountains are ranked by height, the definition of the topographical prominence used to classify the mountain (e.g. the change in elevation required between neighbouring mountains), is noted.

Many British definitions consider a peak with a prominence below , as being a top, and not a mountain (e.g. must be a Marilyn).

While Irish mountains are ranked according to Irish classifications, they are also ranked on classifications that cover Britain and Ireland (e.g. Simms and P600s).

Definitions

General concepts

There is no consensus on the definition of "mountain", but in Britain and Ireland it is often taken to be a summit over 2,000 ft, or more latterly, 600 m. Prominence is even strongly debated regarding UIAA classification of Himalayan mountains. In the alps, the UIAA requires a prominence of over 30 m to be a "peak" and over 300 m to be a "mountain".

The only definition in which prominence is not used, is where topographic isolation is used (e.g. the use of "sufficient separation" for Munros).

Main classifications

Other classifications

The term Dillon is used to describe any of the 212 Irish summits in Paddy Dillon's well–regarded Irish 2010 climbing guidebook: "The Mountains of Ireland".

Myrddyn Deweys are the Irish equivalent of Deweys, which extend the Hewitt classification down to 500 metres. There are 200 Myrddyn Deweys.

MountainViews Online Database 

MountainViews was created in 2002 by Simon Stewart as a non–profit online database for climbers in Ireland to document and catalogue their Irish climbs.  Its main data source are from the Ordnance Survey Ireland (OSI) maps, although it also conducts its own surveys, which the OSI has integrated into its own database, and it also integrates other important Irish mountain databases such as the Paul Tempan's work with the Placenames Database of Ireland (Loganim).  Collins Press published the MountainView Online Datase in 2013 in the book: A Guide to Ireland's Mountain Summits: The Vandeleur-Lynams & the Arderins.

Since 2012, MountainViews has been partnered with the Database of British and Irish Hills (DoBIH), which is the main live database for the categorisation of mountains and hills in Britain and Ireland.  However, MountainViews can differ slightly from DoBIH on the measurements for certain Irish mountains.

List of the 10 Highest MacGillycuddy's Reeks

The MacGillycuddy's Reeks range contains Ireland's highest mountain, Carrauntoohil , and the Reeks is the highest range of peaks in Ireland. Regardless, the range contains ten of the thirteen Scottish Furths in Ireland, and given its importance, and as an important example of complexity of mountain classification, the ten highest Reeks are listed below:

100 Highest Irish Mountains 

(any height, prominence over 100 m)

This is the MountainViews 100 Highest Irish Mountains list, which was published by Collins Press in the 2013 book: A Guide to Ireland's Mountain Summits: The Vandeleur-Lynams & the Arderins. It combines Paul Tempan's 2012 research into Irish mountains and Irish mountain names. It is a widely used list, and it contains 25 of the 26 Irish P600s (Slieve Snaght, a P600, did not make the 100 Highest).

List of 406 Irish Arderins 

(height above 500 m, prominence over 30 m)

The 199 Arderins below  are the Myrddyn Deweys (e.g. the total of the 207 Irish Hewitts and the 199 Myrddyn Deweys equal the 406 Irish Arderins).

MountainView's Online Database of Arderins was published by Collins Press in the 2013 book: A Guide to Ireland's Mountain Summits: The Vandeleur-Lynams & the Arderins, and updated in 2015.  In 2018, the MountainView Online Database listed 406 Irish mountains as meeting the Arderin definition.  , nobody is officially recorded as climbing all the Irish Arderins.

In 2018, Ireland had 124 Arderin Begs.

List of 273 Irish Vandeleur-Lynams 

(height above 600 m, prominence over 15 m)

The 100 Highest Irish Mountains from above, is a subset of this list (e.g. they are all Vandeleur-Lynams). For example, Mweelrea, the highest mountain in Connacht, is 16th on the 100 Highest Irish Mountains list, but 34th on the Vandeleur-Lynam list. MountainView's Online Database of Vandeleur-Lynams was published by Collins Press in the 2013 book: A Guide to Ireland's Mountain Summits: The Vandeleur-Lynams & the Arderins, and updated in 2015. In 2018, the MountainView Online Database listed 273 Irish mountains as meeting the Vandeleur-Lynam definition.

On 3 October 2018, English Lake District climber, James Forrest, completed all 273 Irish Vandeleur-Lynams in 8 weeks.

Lists of Irish hills

Carns 
MountainViews and Database of British and Irish Hills recognise a list of 337 summits as Carns, having height above  and below .

Binnions 
MountainViews and Database of British and Irish Hills recognise a list of 484 summits as Binnions, having prominence at least  and height below .

List of Irish County and Provincial Tops

Provincial Tops

There are 4 Irish Provincial Tops, namely: Carrauntoohil, in Munster, Lugnaquilla in Leinster, Slieve Donard, in Ulster, and Mweelrea in Connacht.

 List of Irish counties by highest point, list of Irish Provincial Tops

County Tops

In addition, there are 27 Irish County Tops, as 10 counties share the same county top, namely: Galtymore for Limerick/Tipperary, Mount Leinster for Carlow/Wexford, Sawel for Londonderry/Tyrone, Cuilcagh for Cavan/Fermanagh, Arderin for Laois/Offaly.

 List of Irish counties by highest point, list of Irish County Tops

Ranking of Irish mountains in Ireland and Britain

Whereas the MountainViews, Vandeleur-Lynam, and Arderin classifications are unique to Ireland, Irish mountains appear in other similar classifications that have been used in across Britain and Ireland.

Simms

The Britain and Ireland Simms classification (height over 600 m, and prominence above 30 m), is very similar to the Irish Arderin classification (height over 500 m, and prominence over 30 m). , the 2,754 Simms in Britain and Ireland, which include 224 Irish Simms (i.e. the Irish Arderins over 600 m), are ranked by height, and by prominence, on this table:

 List of mountains of the British Isles by height, for ranking by height and by prominence, of peaks that are Simms, with prominence over

Hewitts

Irish Hewitts, which have largely been replaced by the metric Simms classification, are ranked against English and Welsh Hewitts on these tables:

 List of Hewitt mountains in England, Wales and Ireland, for ranking by height, of peaks that are Hewitts, with prominence over

Marilyns

The popular Britain and Ireland Marilyn classification (any height, and prominence above 150 m), is a more severe prominence threshold than the Irish Mountainviews classification (height over 500 m, and prominence over 100 m).  , the 2,011 Marilyns in Britain and Ireland, which include 454 Irish Marilyns (e.g. the amount is larger because Marilyns will take any height, as long as the peak meets the prominence threshold), are ranked by prominence, and by height, here (note that this list is commonly used to rank by prominence, as it includes any peak with prominence above 150 m):

 List of Marilyns in the British Isles, for ranking by height and by prominence, of peaks that are Marilyns, with prominence over

P600s

The Britain and Ireland P600 classification require a prominence above 600 m (e.g. and by definition, the height must, therefore, be above 600 m), and are thus called the "Majors".  , the 120 P600s in Britain and Ireland, which include 26 Irish P600s, are ranked by height here:

 List of P600 mountains in the British Isles, for ranking by height and by prominence, of peaks that are P600s, with prominence over

Furths

Finally, the Scottish Furth classification is for mountains that the Scottish Mountaineering Club ("SMC") identify as meeting the classification for a Scottish Munro, however, they are outside (e.g. they are "furth") of Scotland.  , the 34 Furths in Britain and Ireland, which includes 13 Irish Furths, are ranked by height here:

 List of Furth mountains in the British Isles, for ranking by height, or peaks that are considered Furths by the SMC

List by province by range

Munster
An Triúr Deirfiúr – County Kerry
Ballyhoura Mountains – Counties Cork and Limerick
Carron Mountain
Seefin (Ballyhoura Mountains)
Boggeragh Mountains – County Cork
Musheramore
Caha Mountains – County Cork
Hungry Hill
Sugarloaf (Cork)
Comeragh Mountains – County Waterford
Fauscoum
Derrynasaggart Mountains – County Cork
Mullaghanish
Devil's Bit – County Tipperary
Dingle Peninsula – County Kerry
Mount Brandon
Beenoskee
Mount Eagle
Galty Mountains – Counties Cork, Limerick, Tipperary
Galtymore
Temple Hill
Geokaun Mountain – County Kerry
Glanaruddery Mountains – County Kerry
Ivereagh Peninsula – County Kerry
Bentee
Stumpa Dúloigh 
Mullaghanattin 
Broaghnabinnia
Knockmealdown Mountains – Counties Tipperary and Waterford
Knockmealdown
Sugarloaf Hill (Knockmealdowns)
MacGillycuddy's Reeks – County Kerry
Carrauntoohil
Beenkeragh
Caher
Knocknapeasta
Mangerton Group also known as Mangerton Mountains – County Kerry
Mangerton Mountain
Torc Mountain
Mount Gabriel – County Cork
Mullaghareirk Mountains – Counties Cork and Limerick
Purple Mountain – County Kerry
Shehy Mountains – Counties Cork and Kerry
Knockboy
Silvermine Mountains – Counties Tipperary and Limerick
Slievekimalta (Keeper Hill)
Paps of Anu – County Kerry
Slieve Aughty – County Clare
Slieve Callan – County Clare
Slieve Mish Mountains – County Kerry
Baurtregaum
Caherconree
Slieve Miskish Mountains – County Cork
Knockoura
Slieveardagh Hills – Counties Tipperary and Kilkenny
Slievenamon – County Tipperary
Stack's Mountains – County Kerry

Leinster
Blackstairs Mountains – Counties Carlow and Wexford
Black Rock Mountain
Blackstairs Mountain
Croaghaun
Mount Leinster
Brandon Hill – County Kilkenny
Carn Clonhugh also known as Corn Hill – County Longford
Cooley Mountains – County Louth
Clermont Carn
Slieve Foy
Coppanagh – County Kilkenny
Croghan Hill – County Offaly
Dalkey Hill – County Dun Laoghaire-Rathdown (old County Dublin)
Faughan Hill – County Meath
Hill of Allen – County Kildare
Hill of Ben – County Westmeath
Hill of Tara – County Meath
Hill of Uisneach – County Westmeath
Hill of Ward – County Meath
Killiney Hill – County Dun Laoghaire-Rathdown (old County Dublin)
Knockeyon – County Westmeath
Mount Alto – County Kilkenny
Mullaghmeen – County Westmeath
Naul Hills
Slieveardagh Hills – County Kilkenny
Clomantagh Hill
Knocknamuck
Shielmartin Hill – County Fingal (old County Dublin)
Slieve Bloom Mountains – Counties Laois and Offaly
Arderin
Barcam
Baunreaghcong
Carroll's Hill
Castleconor
Farbreague
Garraunbaun
Ridge of Capard
Stillbrook Hill
Wolftrap Mountain
Slieveboy – County Wexford
Slieve na Calliagh – County Meath
Wicklow Mountains
Annagh Hill
Camaderry
Camenabologue
Carrick Mountain
Church Mountain also known as Slieve Gad
Cloghernagh
Conavalla
Corrigasleggaun
Croghan Mountain
Cupidstown Hill
Djouce
Duff Hill
Gravale
Great Sugar Loaf
Keadeen Mountain
Kilmashogue
Kippure
Larch Hill
Little Sugar Loaf also known as Giltspur Mountain
Lobawn
Luggala also known as Fancy Mountain
Lugnaquilla
Maulin
Montpelier Hill
Mullacor
Mullaghcleevaun
Seefingan
Slievemaan
Sugarloaf (West Wicklow)
Table Mountain
Tibradden Mountain
Tonelagee
Two Rock and Three Rock

Ulster
Antrim Hills* – County Antrim
Slemish
Tievebulliagh
Antrim Plateau* – County Londonderry
Binevenagh
Donald's Hill
Belfast Hills* – County Antrim
Black Mountain
Cavehill
Divis
Lisburn* – County Antrim
White Mountain
Belmore Mountain* – County Fermanagh
Bluestack Mountains also known as Croaghgorms – County Donegal
Croaghgorm
Cuilcagh* and Benaughlin* – Counties Fermanagh and Cavan
Derryveagh Mountains – County Donegal
Aghla Beg
Aghla More
Ardloughnabrackbaddy
Crocknalaragagh
Errigal
Mackoght
Muckish
Inishowen
Slieve Snaght
Loughermore* – County Londonderry
Mourne Mountains* – County Down
Slieve Bearnagh
Slieve Binnian
Slieve Commedagh
Slieve Donard
Slieve Muck
Ben Crom
Ouley Hill* – County Down
Slieve Beagh* – Counties Fermanagh, Tyrone, Monaghan
Slieve Croob* – County Down
Slieve Gullion* – County Armagh
Sliabh gCuircin* Camlough Mountain – County Armagh
Slieve Rushen* – Counties Fermanagh and Cavan
Southwest Donegal – County Donegal
Slieve League
Sperrins* – Counties Londonderry and Tyrone
Benbradagh
Dart Mountain
Mullaghcarn
Mullaghmore
Sawel Mountain
Slieve Gallion

Connacht
Achill Island – County Mayo
Croaghaun
Slievemore
Ben Gorm – County Mayo
Croagh Patrick – County Mayo
Clare Island – County Mayo
Knockmore
Curlew Mountains – Counties Sligo and Roscommon
Dartry Mountains  – Counties Sligo and Leitrim
Benbulben
Truskmore
Knocknarea – County Sligo
Maumturks – County Galway
Letterbreckaun
Binn idir an dá Log
BinnMhor
Corcogemore
Lackavrea
Mweelrea – County Mayo
Nephin Beg Range – County Mayo
Nephin
Nephin Beg
Slieve Carr
Ox Mountains – County Sligo
Knockalongy
Knocknashee
Partry Mountains – Counties Mayo and Galway
Devilsmother
Maumtrasna – County Mayo
Sheeffry Range – County Mayo
Barrclashcame
Twelve Bens – County Galway
Benbaun
Bencorr
Bencollaghduff
Errisbeg
Diamond Hill
Tully Mountain

See also

List of long-distance trails in the Republic of Ireland
List of Irish counties by highest point
List of mountains of the British Isles by height
List of mountains of the British Isles by prominence
List of Furths in the British Isles
List of Marilyns in the British Isles
List of P600 mountains in the British Isles
List of Hewitt mountains in England, Wales and Ireland
List of mountain lists
Lists of mountains and hills in the British Isles

Notes

References

External links
MountainViews: The Irish Mountain Website
MountainViews: Irish Online Mountain Database
The Database of British and Irish Hills , the largest database of British Isles mountains ("DoBIH")
Hill Bagging UK & Ireland, the searchable interface for the DoBIH
Ordnance Survey Ireland ("OSI") Online Map Viewer
Logainm: Placenames Database of Ireland
More Relative Hills of Britain, 2007 Mark Jackson (update to Alan Dawson's books using the DoBIH)

Mountains and hills of Ireland
Ireland
Ireland
Ireland